Carey Mordaunt, Countess of Peterborough and Monmouth (13 May 1709), was an English courtier. She was a maid of honour to Charles II's queen consort, Catherine of Braganza, from 1674 to 1680, and one of the Hampton Court Beauties painted by Sir Godfrey Kneller for Queen Mary II.

Life
Her father was Sir Alexander Fraser, 1st Baronet, of Durris in the County of Kincardine (1607–1681), physician to Charles II, and her mother was Mary Carey, daughter of Sir Ferdinando Carey and Philippa Throckmorton.

In 1678 she married Charles Mordaunt, 2nd Viscount Mordaunt (1658–1735), later 3rd Earl of Peterborough, and created Earl of Monmouth (in 1689). The marriage was, however, kept secret until May 1680.

They had three children:
 Lady Henrietta Mordaunt (d. 1760), wife of Alexander Gordon, 2nd Duke of Gordon;
 John Mordaunt, Viscount Mordaunt (c.1681–1710);
 Capt. Hon. Henry Mordaunt, RN (d. 27 February 1710).

References

1650s births
1709 deaths
17th-century Scottish women
Year of birth uncertain
British maids of honour
Peterborough
Daughters of baronets
Court of Charles II of England